The Institute of Liberal Politics (ILP), also known as the School of Liberal Politics is a non-governmental educational and research institute in Armenia. The ILP was founded in 2017 and is headquartered in Yerevan.

History
The Institute of Liberal Politics was founded on 27 September 2017 as an NGO by Bright Armenia, an Armenian political party. The opening ceremony was attended by Nikol Pashinyan, political scientist Ara Papian, and former EU Ambassador to Armenia Piotr Świtalski. The ILP is a full member of the European Liberal Forum. Tatev Matinyan is the current Director of the ILP.

The ILP offers an educational program focused on liberal politics. In 2018, Ambassador of the United States of America to Armenia Lynne M. Tracy met with students of the program. In 2019, former President of Armenia Armen Sarkissian and Chairman of Bright Armenia Edmon Marukyan attended a graduation ceremony for students of the program. As of 2022, 150 students have graduated from the program.

Partners of the ILP include the Friedrich Naumann Foundation and the National Democratic Institute.

On 21 January 2023, the ILP in collaboration with the Embassy of the Netherlands in Armenia organized a conference on combating hate speech, promoting political pluralism, and developing a more tolerant and democratic society. Representatives from the European Party of Armenia, Republic Party, Civil Contract, the Human Rights Defender of Armenia, and Union of Informed Citizens were invited to participate.

Mission
The Institute of Liberal Politics aims at preparing a new generation of leaders who are willing to support and spread liberal values and become advocates for democratic consolidation through non-formal civic and political education throughout Armenia. The organization seeks to advance human rights, multilateralism, cultural exchange, inclusiveness, and the empowerment of society. The ILP also supports the European integration of Armenia. The ILP organizes education seminars, conducts research, participates in debates, and provides expert opinions on domestic and foreign issues.

See also

 Education in Armenia
 Liberalism in Armenia
 Politics in Armenia

References

External links
 Institute of Liberal Politics on Facebook

Armenia–European Union relations
Organizations based in Europe
Organizations established in 2017
Political organizations based in Armenia
Research institutes in Armenia